

549001–549100 

|-bgcolor=#f2f2f2
| colspan=4 align=center | 
|}

549101–549200 

|-bgcolor=#f2f2f2
| colspan=4 align=center | 
|}

549201–549300 

|-bgcolor=#f2f2f2
| colspan=4 align=center | 
|}

549301–549400 

|-bgcolor=#f2f2f2
| colspan=4 align=center | 
|}

549401–549500 

|-bgcolor=#f2f2f2
| colspan=4 align=center | 
|}

549501–549600 

|-bgcolor=#f2f2f2
| colspan=4 align=center | 
|}

549601–549700 

|-id=663
| 549663 Barczaszabolcs ||  || Szabolcs Barcza (1944–2021) was a Hungarian astronomer and honorary professor at the Eötvös Loránd University (ELTE). His research included atmospheric radiative transfers, both in stars and on Earth. || 
|}

549701–549800 

|-id=744
| 549744 Heimpál ||  || Pál Heim (1875–1929), a Hungarian pediatrician and university professor who specialized in treating babies and children. The Pál Heim Children's Hospital in Budapest was named in his honor. || 
|}

549801–549900 

|-bgcolor=#f2f2f2
| colspan=4 align=center | 
|}

549901–550000 

|-id=996
| 549996 Dmitriiguliutin ||  || Dmitrii Guliutin (born 1965), a Russian historian on space-science and amateur astronomer, who has worked in the aerospace industry and as a researcher in space museums. || 
|}

References 

549001-550000